Rhys Bowles Shirley (born 18 January 2003) is an English professional footballer who recently played as a forward for the EFL League One club Plymouth Argyle.

Career
Shirley made his professional debut with Plymouth Argyle in a 2–0 EFL League One loss to Rotherham United on 7 August 2021.

He scored his first senior goal against Swansea City in the League Cup on 24 August 2021.

Shirley was released by Plymouth Argyle in July 2022.

References

External links
 

2003 births
Living people
English footballers
English Football League players
Plymouth Argyle F.C. players
Association football forwards